Maureen Medved is a Canadian writer and playwright. She is also an assistant professor at the University of British Columbia. She has been published in literary journals and magazines and has had her plays produced in Vancouver, British Columbia, Waterloo, Ontario and Toronto, Ontario. She wrote a screenplay based on her first novel The Tracey Fragments, which was made into a film of the same name directed by Bruce McDonald and starring Elliot Page.

Her 2018 novel Black Star was shortlisted for the 2019 ReLit Award for fiction and won the CAA Fred Kerner Book Award in 2019.

Bibliography 
 The Tracey Fragments, House of Anansi Press, 2007
 Black Star, Anvil Press, 2018

References

External links
UBC Faculty Page

Canadian women novelists
Canadian women dramatists and playwrights
Screenwriters from British Columbia
Writers from British Columbia
Living people
Year of birth missing (living people)
Academic staff of the University of British Columbia
20th-century Canadian novelists
21st-century Canadian novelists
20th-century Canadian dramatists and playwrights
21st-century Canadian dramatists and playwrights
20th-century Canadian women writers
21st-century Canadian women writers